Callibaetis skokianus is a species of small minnow mayfly in the family Baetidae. It is found in the south half of Canada and the northeastern United States.

References

Mayflies
Articles created by Qbugbot
Insects described in 1903